Bhagat Pipa, also known as Pratap Singh Raja Pipaji, Rao Pipa, Sardar Pipa, Sant Pipaji, or Pipa Bairagi was a Rajput King of Gagaraungarh who abdicated the throne to become a Hindu mystic poet and saint of the Bhakti movement. He was born in the Malwa region of North India (east Rajasthan) in approximately AD 1425.

Pipa's exact date of birth and death are unknown, but it is believed that he lived in the late fourteenth and early fifteenth century. Born into a warrior class and royal family, Pipa is described as an early Shaivism (Shiva) and Sakta (Durga) follower. Thereafter, he adopted Vaishnavism as a disciple of Ramananda, and later preached Nirguni (god without attributes) beliefs of life.  Bhagat Pipa is considered one of the earliest influential sants of the Bhakti movement in 15th century northern India.

Life

Pipa was born into a Rajput royal family at Gagaron, in the present-day Jhalawar district of Rajasthan. He became the king of Gagaraungarh. Pipa worshipped the Hindu goddess Durga Bhavani and kept her idol in a temple within his palace. While Pipa was the king Gagaraungarh, he abdicated and became a 'sanyasi' and accepted Ramananda as his guru. He then joined Ramananda's Vaishnavism Bhakti, a movement with a strong monist emphasis based out of Varanasi.

According to Bhaktamal, a Bhakti movement hagiography, his wife, Sita, stayed with him before and after his abdication when he became a wandering monk. The hagiography mentions many episodes of his sannyasa life, such as one where robbers tried to steal his buffalo that provided milk to his companions. When he stumbled into the robbery in progress, he began helping the robbers and suggested that they should take the calf. The robbers were so touched that they abandoned their ways and became Pipa's disciples.

In his later life, Bhagat Pipa, as with several other disciples of Ramananda such as Kabir and Dadu Dayal, shifted his devotional worship from saguni Vishnu avatar (Dvaita, dualism) to nirguni (Advaita, monism) god, that is, from god with attributes to god without attributes.
According to the records found with local bards, 52 Rajput chiefs from clans of Gohil, Chauhan, Dahiya, Chavada, Dabhi, Makwana (Jhala), Rakhecha, Bhati, Parmar, Tanwar, Solanki, and Parihar resigned from their titles and offices and gave up alcohol, meat, and violence. Instead, those chiefs dedicated their lives to the teachings of their guru & former king.

Pipa's dates of birth and death are unknown, but the traditional genealogy in Bhakti hagiography suggests that he died in 1400 CE.

Key teachings and influence
Pipa taught that God is within one's own self, and that true worship is to look within and have reverence for God in each human being.

He shared same views as Guru Nanak, the founder of Sikhism, and Bhagat Pipa's hymns are included in the Guru Granth Sahib.

In popular culture 
Shri Krishna Bhakta Peepaji (1923) by Shree Nath Patankar and Bhakt Peepaji (1980) by Dinesh Rawal are two Indian films about the legends of the saint.

References

Further reading
 
Encyclopedia of Sikhism by Harbans Singh. Published by Punjabi University, Patiala

External links
 Exegesis of Bani of Bhagat Pipa - Dharam Singh Nihang Singh

1420s births
Year of death missing
Medieval Hindu religious leaders
Vaishnava saints
Rajasthani people
Sikh Bhagats
People from Jhalawar district
Writers from Varanasi
Scholars from Varanasi
15th-century Indian poets
Poets from Uttar Pradesh
15th-century Indian philosophers